Arthur Upton (1614-1662) of Lupton in the parish of Brixham in Devon, was a Member of Parliament for Devon in 1654 and 1656 during the Protectorate of Oliver Cromwell.

Origins
He was the eldest son and heir of John Upton (1590-1641) of Lupton, four times a Member of Parliament for Dartmouth in Devon (2 1/2 miles south-west of Lupton) at various times between 1625 and 1641, by his wife Dorothy Rous (d.1644) (alias Rowse), a daughter of Sir Anthony Rous of Halton in Cornwall, and sister of Francis Rous (1579-1659), MP.

Marriage and children
In 1638 he married Elizabeth Gould (d. 1685), daughter of William Gould of Floyer Hayes in the parish of St Thomas, Exeter, and widow of Robert Haydon (1604-1634) of Cadhay in the parish of Ottery St Mary, Devon, by whom he had children including:
John Upton (d.1687) of Lupton, a Member of Parliament for Dartmouth from February 1679 to August 1679.

References

1662 deaths
1614 births
Members of the Parliament of England (pre-1707) for Devon
English MPs 1654–1655
English MPs 1656–1658
People from Brixham